One Tree Hill may refer to:

 "One Tree Hill" (song), a 1987 song by U2 referencing One Tree Hill, New Zealand volcanic peak
 One Tree Hill (TV series), a 2003–2012 American drama series named for the U2 song
 One Tree Hill (soundtrack), a 2005 soundtrack album from the series

Places

Australia

 One Tree Hill (Australian Capital Territory), a peak on the ACT-NSW border, near Hall
One Tree Hill (Blue Mountains), a peak at Mount Victoria in the Blue Mountains of New South Wales
 One Tree Hill, Ferntree Gully in the Dandenong Ranges National Park, Victoria
 One Tree Hill, South Australia, a suburb on the northern outskirts of Adelaide, South Australia
 One Tree Hill, former name of Mount Coot-tha, Queensland, in Brisbane
 One Tree Hill, former name of Table Top Mountain near Toowoomba, Queensland
Site of the Battle of One Tree Hill (1843), Queensland

India
 One Tree Hill Point, a location in Matheran Hill Station near Mumbai

New Zealand
 Maungakiekie / One Tree Hill, a volcanic peak in Auckland
 One Tree Hill, New Zealand, a suburb in Auckland at the base of the volcanic peak
 One Tree Hill College, Auckland

Sri Lanka
 One Tree Hill, Sri Lanka, a hill in the Nuwara Eliya District

United Kingdom
 One Tree Hill Country Park in Basildon, Essex
 One Tree Hill, Honor Oak, in London

Other
 One Tree Hill, a codename of the Mozilla Firefox 0.9 release

See also
Tree Hill (disambiguation)